Charles Johnstone may refer to:

 Charles Johnstone (1719-1800), Irish novelist
 Charles Johnstone (1903-date of death unknown), British athlete

See also
 Charles Johnson (disambiguation)
 Charles Johnston (disambiguation)